Oryol Governorate, or the Government of Oryol, was an administrative division (a guberniya) of the Russian Empire and the early Russian SFSR, which existed from 1796 to 1928. Its seat was in the city of Oryol.

Administrative division
Oryol Governorate consisted of the following uyezds (administrative centres in parentheses):
 Bolkhovsky Uyezd (Bolkhov)
 Bryansky Uyezd (Bryansk)
 Dmitrovsky Uyezd (Dmitrovsk)
 Yeletsky Uyezd (Yelets)
 Karachevsky Uyezd (Karachev)
 Kromskoy Uyezd (Kromy)
 Livensky Uyezd (Livny)
 Maloarkhangelsky Uyezd (Maloarkhangelsk)
 Mtsensky Uyezd (Mtsensk)
 Orlovsky Uyezd (Oryol)
 Sevsky Uyezd (Sevsk)
 Trubchevsky Uyezd (Trubchevsk)

References

 
Governorates of the Russian Empire
States and territories established in 1796
States and territories disestablished in 1928
1796 establishments in the Russian Empire